China Wharf is a grade II listed residential building in Bermondsey, in London. It was designed in 1982–83 by Piers Gough of CZWG.

References 

Grade II listed buildings in the London Borough of Southwark
Postmodern architecture in the United Kingdom